Waddell House, also known as Pastorium of the First Baptist Church or Van Amburg House, is a historic home located at Lexington, Lafayette County, Missouri.  It was built about 1840, and is a two-story, red brick dwelling on a partial basement. It features decorative elements such as clustered chimney pots, scalloped vergeboards with pendants, and a spindled stickwork Late Victorian porch with mansard roof.  William Bradford Waddell acquired the house in trade for stock in the local Baptist Female College in 1869.

It was listed on the National Register of Historic Places in 1979. It is located in the Old Neighborhoods Historic District.

References

Individually listed contributing properties to historic districts on the National Register in Missouri
Houses on the National Register of Historic Places in Missouri
Victorian architecture in Missouri
Houses completed in 1840
Houses in Lafayette County, Missouri
National Register of Historic Places in Lafayette County, Missouri